Garland E. "Sonny" Moran (June 29, 1926 – December 18, 2016) was an American college basketball coach and athletics administrator. He served as the head men's baseball coach at Morris Harvey College—now the University of Charleston—from  1957 to 1965 and West Virginia University from 1969 to 1974.

Moran played college basketball at Morris Harvey, where he was a four-year starter from 1946 to 1950. He returned to MHC as head coach on 1957, where he compiled a 147–76 record. He then moved to West Virginia as an assistant, moving into the head coaching position in 1969 when Bucky Waters moved to Duke University. In five seasons with the Mountaineers, Moran led the team to a 57–68 record. He left to become athletic director at Morehead State University, where he stayed for fourteen seasons. He then was commissioner of the Gulf South Conference until his retirement in 1992.

Moran died in Gulf Shores, Alabama on December 18, 2016 at age 90.

References

External links
 WVU coaching record

1926 births
2016 deaths
American men's basketball coaches
American men's basketball players
Basketball coaches from West Virginia
Basketball players from West Virginia
Charleston Golden Eagles men's basketball coaches
Charleston Golden Eagles men's basketball players
College men's basketball head coaches in the United States
Gulf South Conference commissioners
Morehead State Eagles athletic directors
West Virginia Mountaineers men's basketball coaches